The Gueydon-class cruiser was a three-ship class of armored cruisers built in the first decade of the twentieth century for the French Navy.

Design and description 

Designed by the naval architect Emile Bertin, the Gueydon-class ships were intended to be smaller and cheaper than the preceding armored cruiser design, . Like the older ship, they were intended to fill the commerce-raiding strategy of the Jeune École. They displaced . They had a crew of 566 officers and enlisted men.

The Gueydon class had three vertical triple-expansion steam engines, each driving a single propeller shaft.

The ships of the Gueydon class had a main armament that consisted of two 40-caliber  guns that were mounted in single gun turrets, one each fore and aft of the superstructure. Their secondary armament comprised eight 45-caliber quick-firing (QF)  guns in casemates. For anti-torpedo boat defense, they carried four 45-caliber QF  guns on the forecastle deck, ten QF  and four QF  Hotchkiss guns. They were also armed with two submerged  torpedo tubes.

The curved lower protective deck ranged in thickness from 2 to 2.2 inches. A watertight internal cofferdam, filled with cellulose, stretched between these two decks. Their ammunition hoists had 2 inches of armor and the 100-millimeter guns were protected by gun shields. The sides of the conning tower were 160 millimeters thick. The forward end of the casemate compartment was closed off by a  bulkhead and a  bulkhead extended down to the lower deck at the rear end of the compartment.

Ships

References

Bibliography 

 
 

 
Ship classes of the French Navy